The 2005 Radio Disney Music Awards were held at the Radio Disney, studios. Aly & AJ was the biggest winner that year. The award show was broadcast on the Radio Disney network.

Nominees and winners

Best Female Artist
Hilary Duff
Lindsay Lohan
JoJo

Best Male Artist
Jesse McCartney
Lil' Romeo
Justin Timberlake

Best Actress Turned Singer
Raven-Symoné
Emma Roberts
Hayden Panettiere

Best Song
"Wake Up" – Hilary Duff
"Rumors" – Lindsay Lohan
"Beautiful Soul" – Jesse McCartney

Best Soundtrack Song
"Shake a Tail Feather" – Cheetah Girls (The Cheetah Girls)
"First" – Lindsay Lohan (Herbie: Fully Loaded)
"Fly" – Hilary Duff (Raise Your Voice)

Best TV Movie Song
"Rush" – Aly & AJ (Twitches)
"Good Life" – Jesse McCartney (A Cinderella Story)
"My Hero Is You" – Hayden Panettiere (Tiger Cruise)

Best TV Show Song
"Follow Me" – Jamie Lynn Spears (Zoey 101)
"Found a Way" – Drake Bell (Drake & Josh)
"Dummy" – Emma Roberts (Unfabulous)

Best Song You Can't Believe Your Parents Know the Words To
"Do You Believe in Magic" – Aly & AJ
"Beautiful Soul" – Jesse McCartney
"Wake Up" – Hilary Duff

Best Song to Listen to on the Way to School
"Walking on Sunshine" – Aly & AJ
"Rumors" – Lindsay Lohan
"Wake Up" – Hilary Duff

Most Stylish Singer
Amanda Bynes
Hilary Duff
Lindsay Lohan

References

External links
Official website

Radio Disney Music Awards
Radio Disney Music Awards
Radio Disney
Radio Disney Music Awards
2005 awards in the United States